Electric torque may refer to:
Electric torque, responsible for heating water in microwave ovens
 The rotational force acting against electric dipole placed in an electric field
 The mechanical torque of the electrical motor

See also
Torque wrench